An election to Hertfordshire County Council took place on 4 June 2009 the date of the 2009 United Kingdom local elections. The whole elected council was up for election.  The councillors were elected from the 77 wards, which return one each by first-past-the-post voting for a four-year term of office.  The wards were the same as those used at the previous election in 2005.

All locally registered electors (British, Irish, Commonwealth and European Union citizens) who were aged 18 or over on Thursday 4 June 2009 were entitled to vote in the local elections. Those who were temporarily away from their ordinary address (for example, away working, on holiday, in student accommodation or in hospital) were also entitled to vote in the local elections, although those who had moved abroad and registered as overseas electors cannot vote in the local elections. It is possible to register to vote at more than one address (such as a university student who had a term-time address and lives at home during holidays) at the discretion of the local Electoral Register Office, but it remains an offence to vote more than once in the same local government election.

Summary
The Conservative Party retained and reinforced its control of the council with a net gain of 9 seats, and maintained an electoral stranglehold on the east of the county winning all seats in Broxbourne District, East Herts District, Hertsmere District & North Herts District. The Conservative party made significant gains in Stevenage District (3 seats), Dacorum District (3 seats), Welwyn Hatfield District (2 seats), Hertsmere District (2 seats) and North Herts District (2 seats). The Labour Party lost 13 seats, notably 3 in Stevenage District.  This result left them with only 3 seats at County Hall. The Liberal Democrats gained 3 seats overall with a particularly strong performance in St Albans District at the expense of the Conservatives. The British National Party gained a seat in South Oxhey at the expense of Labour.  It is also notable that the BNP came 2nd in the popular vote in Broxbourne District. The Green Party retained the seat gained in 2005 at Callowland Leggatts.

Election results

Results Summary by District

Division Results

Broxbourne (6 Seats)

Dacorum (10 Seats)

East Herts (10 Seats)

Hertsmere (7 Seats)

North Herts (9 Seats)

St Albans (10 Seats)

Stevenage (6 Seats)

Three Rivers (6 Seats)

Watford (6 Seats)

Welwyn Hatfield (7 Seats)

References

2009 English local elections
2009
2000s in Hertfordshire